Sheikha Al Anoud bint Dahham Al Fayez (born 1957) is a Jordanian noblewoman and former Saudi royal. She is the daughter of one of the sheikhs of the Al-Fayez clan from Bani Sakher, Sheikh Daham bin Dardah Al-Bakhit Al-Fayez in Jordan. She was the wife of King Abdullah bin Abdulaziz Al Saud between from 1972 to 2003 when they divorced. She is the mother of four daughters: Jawaher, Hala, Maha, and Sahar.

Marriage to the Saudi king 
When she was fifteen years old, Sheikha Al Anoud entered into an arranged marriage with King Abdullah of Saudi Arabia. They have four daughters together: Sheikha Jawaher bint Abdullah bin Abdulaziz, Sheikha Hala bint Abdullah bin Abdulaziz, Sheikha Maha bint Abdullah bin Abdulaziz, and Sheikha Sahar bint Abdullah bin Abdulaziz. Sheikha Alanoud and King Abdullah divorced in 2003.

The case of Al Anoud and her daughters
Al Anoud Al Fayez appealed to US President Barack Obama during his visit to Saudi Arabia to intervene to release her four daughters who had been detained by their father for 14 years, contrary to their desire in a palace in Jeddah, while noting that her daughters had not yet obtained an ID or passport and eat one meal per day.

Al Anoud Al Fayez, in an interview with The Times stated that her four daughters were being held by force, and cut off from the outside world. The king appointed the daughters' half-brother to monitor them and document any request for them to leave the palace, provided that it is subject to strict restrictions and was for the purpose of purchases only.

The Sunday Times newspaper sent the full details of the allegations of the two sisters and their mother to the Saudi embassy in London without receiving a response from them, and the United Nations High Commissioner for Human Rights also conveyed the letter of Al Anoud to Rashida Mango, the United Nations Special Rapporteur on violence against women, to take the necessary measures. She has lived since her divorce in 2003 in London.

References

20th-century Saudi Arabian women
21st-century Saudi Arabian women
1957 births
Living people
Al Anoud
Jordanian nobility
Spouses of Saudi kings
Saudi Arabian women's rights activists